Events from the year 1925 in Uruguay

Incumbents 
 President: José Serrato

Events 
August 2: 1925 Uruguayan National Administration Council election

Births
February 25: Eduardo Risso, Olympic rower

Deaths

References 

 
1920s in Uruguay
Years of the 20th century in Uruguay
Uruguay
Uruguay